Mario Cartelli (born 16 November 1979 in Karviná) is a Czech former professional ice hockey defenceman of Italian descent. He was drafted 262nd overall in the 2001 NHL Entry Draft by the Atlanta Thrashers.

Cartelli played in the Czech Extraliga for HC Oceláři Třinec, HC Kladno, HC Havířov and HC Plzeň. He also played in the Slovak Extraliga for HC Slovan Bratislava and in Serie A for HC Fassa.

Career statistics

Regular season and playoffs

International

References

External links
 

1979 births
Living people
Atlanta Thrashers draft picks
HC Berounští Medvědi players
Czech ice hockey defencemen
Czech people of Italian descent
Rytíři Kladno players
HC Havířov players
HC Oceláři Třinec players
HC Olomouc players
HC Prostějov players
HC Plzeň players
HC Slovan Bratislava players
Sportspeople from Karviná
SHC Fassa players
Stadion Hradec Králové players
Czech expatriate sportspeople in Italy
Expatriate ice hockey players in Italy
Czech expatriate ice hockey players in Slovakia